KTWC-LD, virtual channel 12 (UHF digital channel 34), is a low-powered TBN-affiliated television station licensed to Crockett, Texas, United States. Founded in 2007, the station is owned by International Broadcasting Network. It broadcasts services from Lufkin First Baptist Church every Monday, Carpenter's Way Baptist Church on Tuesday, and several other local organization's events.

Digital Television

Digital channels  
The station's digital signal is multiplexed:

References

External links

TWC-LD
Television channels and stations established in 2012
Low-power television stations in the United States
2012 establishments in Texas